The Minister-President of the German-speaking Community is the head of the Government of the German-speaking Community of Belgium, one of the three Communities of the country.

List of officeholders

Timeline

See also
 Prime Minister of Belgium
 Minister-President of the Brussels-Capital Region
 Minister-President of Flanders
 Minister-President of the French Community
 Minister-President of Wallonia

1984 establishments in Belgium
Minister-President
German-speaking Community, Minister-Presidents